The Kirna, known locally as Kirna House (previously also as Grangehill), is a Category A listed villa in Walkerburn, Peeblesshire, Scotland. It is one of four villas in Walkerburn designed by Frederick Thomas Pilkington between 1867 and 1869 for the Ballantyne family. It is listed as a fine example of a Pilkington mansion retaining original external features, a fine interior, and for its importance as a Ballantyne property.

The Ballantyne family played a leading role in Scotland's textile industry for nearly two hundred years. The Ballantynes were substantially responsible for founding the village of Walkerburn after Henry Ballantyne first bought land at that location to build a tweed mill in 1846. Architect F T Pilkington was commissioned by the Ballantynes to design and build the new village with houses for the mill workers, and villas for the mill owners and their families.

The Kirna's proximity to a significant number of ancient man-made structures, including some dating back to pre-historic times, suggests that this general location along the Tweed valley has been of strategic importance to settlers throughout history.

Design & architecture

The Kirna was designed by British architect Frederick Thomas Pilkington. It retains all of its original 1867 Scots Baronial and Venetian Romanesque design features including an idiosyncratic tower in Ruskinian Gothic style. The heavy oak main staircase features distinctive turned and carved balusters also found in F T Pilkington's own house, Egremont, 38 Dick Place, Edinburgh, and grotesque finials holding shields sporting the initials of George Ballantyne and his wife Marion White Aitken (1841-1914).  The hallway features a large glass cupola and an artist's studio is housed in the turret room. The dining room ceiling incorporates the initials of Colin Ballantyne and his wife Isabella Milne Welsh (1881-1969), respectively.

Of special architectural note is the main entrance and heavily decorated (sculpted) elevation featuring a central flight of ashlar steps leading to a polygonal, arcaded loggia entrance area which is supported by two rope-moulded arches. Immediately above the entrance is the first floor with prominent chequered detail between the band courses, and a repeat of the rope moulding around the windows. The second floor features a turret with two finialled dormers. The Kirna shares many of these design elements with another F T Pilkington building originally known as Craigend Park in Edinburgh, designed and built for William Christie between 1866 and 1869, a "Glover and Breeches Maker" (tailor) at 16 George Street who is believed to have sourced much of his material from the Ballantyne mills.

Designs of The Kirna were exhibited at the Royal Scottish Academy in 1867. The subsequent review in The Builder noted that "Pilkington is never commonplace, though frequently wild and eccentric". The Kirna was praised as "a pleasing example of the modern style Gothic as applied to domestic purposes: abundance of light is given, and variety is secured without violent contrast".

Drawings of alterations dated 1903 by James Jerdan (architect at 12 Castle Street, Edinburgh), indicate the addition of a coal chute and "heating chamber" area located beside the main building. The 1903 alterations included the addition of a 'boudoir' (now game room) to the west gable, and a bedroom on the first floor.

The boundary wall and a glass house still survive. The entrance gates were likely removed during the war in 1941 when the government passed an order compulsorily requisitioning all post-1850 iron gates and railings for the war effort.

History

Ownership

The Kirna was built between 1866 and 1867 by George Wilkie (1821-1892) of Hayfield Villa, Peebles for George Ballantyne (1836-1924), third son of Henry Ballantyne (1802-1865). George acquired the site from Alexander Horsburgh of Horsburgh in 1867 after having built the boundary walls, driveway, and some or all of the house. The deed explicitly provided for George to draw his domestic water from the Kirna Burn until such time as a reservoir was constructed to supply the Estate of Pirn, and to source stone from Purveshill quarries. He and his family owned and occupied The Kirna between 1867 and 1880 when, curiously, he sold the property to his brother David Ballantyne (1825-1912).

Marian Currie (1830-1903, née Upwood), widow of Charles Currie (1829-1878), son of Sir Frederick Currie, 1st Baronet), acquired the property in 1888 and remained at The Kirna until she died in 1903 and the property was sold to Katherine "Kitty" Hamilton Bruce (1863-1928), widow of Robert Hamilton Bruce (1846-1899), a successful Glasgow businessman, and daughter of Simon Somerville (Tae) Laurie (1829-1909), a Scottish educator. Kitty owned The Kirna (Grangehill at that time) for sixteen years before selling to Colin Ballantyne (1879-1942), son of John Ballantyne (1829-1909), in 1919. Colin Ballantyne continued to own the property until just before his death in 1942. He was the third and final member of the Ballantyne family to have owned The Kirna.
 
Between 1941 and 1992 The Kirna was owned by respectively Emily Skinner ('41-48), James Forbes ('48-53), Winnifred and Henry Pearson Taylor Smith ('53-57), Peter Rodger ('57-59), James Fraser ('59-81), John Rapley ('81-91), and briefly by Peter Hammond ('91-92).

Julian Osborne, solicitor, purchased The Kirna in 1992. It was acquired by the Facey family in 2018.

George, The Kirna, and New Zealand

Between 1870 and 1872 George secured two personal loans amounting to £800 (£97,000 in 2020) using The Kirna as collateral, suggesting that he may have been facing financial difficulties. George advertised The Kirna for sale in  April 1871 after the death of his three-year-old son Henry George Tait (1867-1870), and when it did not sell he advertised it to let, furnished, by the year. In 1874 he mortgaged The Kirna for £1,000 (£116,000 in 2020) and used a portion of the proceeds to repay £500 of his outstanding personal loans. In 1878 The Kirna was put up for auction in Peebles but it did not sell. The remainder of his personal loan amount was repaid in 1879.

George sold The Kirna to his brother David for £2,100 (£258,000 in 2020) when he emigrated to New Zealand in 1880, notionally to enter the wool-buying business to supply the requirements of Henry Ballantyne's mills. David already owned a property (Sunnybrae) in Walkerburn at that time, suggesting that his purchase of The Kirna was designed to facilitate George's departure and possibly his exit from Henry Ballantyne's business. George used the proceeds of the sale to discharge his £1,000 mortgage. David let The Kirna, fully furnished, until 1888 when he auctioned off the furniture and sold the property.

Not long after his arrival in New Zealand, and despite his original mandate, George accepted a position as manager of the newly formed Oamaru Woollen Factory Company in 1881 and there is no record of him engaging with Henry Ballantyne's mills from that time onwards . He went to Britain and selected the plant for the new factory, had the plans for the mill drawn up, and engaged key staff. He was dismissed in May 1884 for performance reasons and put up for auction 1000 of his shares in the factory in the same month. George is also known to have held a management role at the North New Zealand Woollen Manufacturing Company in Onehunga, Auckland between 1886 and 1888. 

For some period immediately prior to his death George is known to have lived in Malvern, Australia with his second daughter, Mary Kyle (1869-1923) who predeceased him by one year. George died in 1924 at the home of his third daughter Amy Philip (1870–1966) in Epsom, New Zealand. His estate was valued at £120 (£7,500 in 2020).

Coach house

The Kirna includes a separate stable block and coach house rather than a traditional entrance lodge. It is believed that Marian Currie commissioned the coach house some time between 1890 and 1900. An 1877 photograph of The Kirna does not show the coach house, and an 1878 for-sale advertisement makes no mention of a coach house. The 1888 disposition recording the sale of The Kirna to Marian Currie also makes no reference to a second dwelling on the property.  The 1891 Census includes a "coachman" named Andrew Newall (1852-1935) residing at Kirna House. The following 1901 Census records Andrew, now "gardener", living in the coach house. And a 1903 advertisement in the Scotsman mentions "stable, coach house, and coachman's house".

Late 19th century maps indicate that the current driveway for the coach house was a road extending to the land on Purvishill, and the whinstone quarries to the north east of the ancient terraces.

In 1923, architect William James Walker Todd made alterations to the stable and coach house for Colin Ballantyne, including converting a section of the stable to a (second) bedroom and a bathroom.

The Kirna and the coach house were formally separated in 1948 when Emily Skinner sold The Kirna to James Forbes who then proceeded to sell the coach house to William Johnson, an architect from Edinburgh.

Property name

At various times The Kirna has been referred to as Kirnie House or Kirna House, amongst others. All three names are an obvious connection to its location at the base of Kirnie Law hill, Kirnie Tower, and a nearby house named Kirna believed to have existed in the 18th century.

Ordnance Survey historical maps published in 1897, 1898 and 1909 record the property as Kirnie House.

The property was once referred to as The Chirney during its construction in 1866, but this is believed to have been a simple misspelling.

Between 1903 and 1919 before it was sold to Colin Ballantyne, The Kirna was known as Grangehill. The owner at that time, Katherine "Kitty" Hamilton Bruce, is known to have resided at The Grange in Dornoch and at Grange Dell in Penicuik, demonstrating a predilection for names including 'Grange'.

The current name, Kirna House, may have come about when the Post Office needed to be able to distinguish between the villa and the coach house (now Kirna Lodge) when the latter was sold as a separate property in 1948.

Kirna 'firsts'
The earliest known photograph of The Kirna dates to approximately 1867–1871 in a collection by royal photographer George Washington Wilson where the property is captured in the background of the town of Innerleithen. The collection incorrectly cites 1877 as the year of the photograph because the 1871 property named Runic Cross on Waverley Road, Innerleithen is not present in the photograph and The Kirna, completed in 1867, is clearly visible.

In August of 1871 the gardener to George Ballantyne committed suicide, allegedly by cuttings own throat after a long period of illness.

At some time prior to 1878 the house was tied in to the Innerleithen gas works on Princes Street, presumably to supply gas lamps throughout the property. The first gas street lamps were installed in Walkerburn in 1878. The alterations of 1903 added a further four fireplaces and a coal-fired hot water boiler in the newly constructed "heating chamber". Gas wall heaters were installed in most rooms in the early 1980s, and hot water was heated by an AGA with an integrated boiler in the kitchen. Modern gas-fired central heating was first installed in approximately 1993.

The first telephones were installed in Walkerburn in 1891and in approximately 1907, Katherine "Kitty" Hamilton Bruce was the first proprietor of The Kirna (then Grangehill) to have enjoyed a magneto telephone mounted on the wall out of sight in the pantry. The telephone would likely have been an NTC No. 1 (a.k.a. GPO No. 59) based on the first-hand account of Catherine Ann Hamilton Bruce (1895-1978), daughter of Kitty. When Colin Ballantyne acquired the house in 1919 his subscriber number was 16 and he could reach his mother at Stoneyhill on number 12, his brother John King Ballantyne at Nether Caberston on number 3, his cousin John Alexander at Sunnybrae on number 14, and the Walkerburn Co-operative Society on number 4, amongst others.

Location

The Kirna is situated on Peebles Road (A72), originally Pink Bank, in the valley of the River Tweed, a few hundred meters west of Walkerburn village. Peebles Road was the turnpike road between Galashiels and Peebles which was constructed in circa 1775.

The property is unusual as it stands away from the other three Ballantyne family houses designed by F T Pilkington in Walkerburn (John Ballantyne's house Stoneyhill, David's house Sunnybrae and Henry's former home Tweedvale) but exhibits features found on the other buildings. Other Ballantyne villas in the vicinity during this era included Holylee owned by Major James George Ballantyne (1837-1884), and The Firs (Horsbrugh Terrace, Innerleithen) owned by James Ballantyne (1839-1903).

The Kirna is in close proximity to almost a dozen man-made structures, some dating back to pre-historic times, illustrating the strategic importance to settlers of the Old North throughout history. The site and surrounding lands benefit from ample supplies of fresh water from the Kirna Burn and the Walker Burn, its elevation above the flood plain of the Tweed River, extensive views up and down the Tweed Valley, the south-facing slope of Kirnie Law, and a rich topsoil.
 
Mid-19th century maps indicate an old whinstone quarry approximately 30 meters beyond the northwest corner of the boundary wall and in the path of the Kirna Burn that travels along the west boundary wall from Kirnie Law to the Tweed river.

Nearby structures

Recent structures

Kirna farm
An 18th century map based on a 1741 survey by William Edgar which was dedicated to Charles Stewart (1697–1764), 5th Earl of Traquair shows a property, likely a farm house, named Kirna approximately 500 meters ENE of the current property, nearby the Walker Burn. Its remains are no longer visible.

Kirna Burn water tank

A for sale advertisement in The Scotsman published on April 15, 1871, cites "an abundance of beautiful spring water" to The Kirna. It is likely that the water tank positioned upstream from The Kirna on Kirna Burn provided that source of fresh water from 1867 until at least 1961 despite local authorities being required by law to provide water to communities from the 1940s. This tank functioned as an intake for some of Walkerburn and also supplied The Kirna via a dedicated cistern tank (see gallery below) visible just beyond the northern perimeter wall.

Kirnie Law reservoir

The Kirna is due south of Kirnie Law Reservoir which was built to provide hydro-electric power for Tweedvale Mill and Tweedholm Mill in Walkerburn, owned by Henry Ballantyne & Sons, Ltd. The project was conceived of and designed by Boving & Co. Ltd. (hydraulic engineers) and became operational in 1922. This was the first working hydro-electric power scheme in the country. The reservoir continued in use until around 1950.

The ferro-concrete reservoir is still substantially intact. Its interior measures 58.5 meters squared by 4.7 meters deep and the walls are 20 centimetres at the top tapering to 35 centimetres at the base. The tank was capable of holding 13.2 million litres of water. There is a surge tank (pumping station) downhill that controlled the water flow to the turbines in the valley.

Kirnie Cottage

Ordnance Survey Name Books for the parish of Innerleithen written prior to the construction of The Kirna cite a "one storey house" named Kirnie, property of the Horsburgh family, situated at or near the current site of The Kirna.

It is believed that the house started life as the shepherd's cottage for Pirn House (demolished in early 1950s) and was built by Stirling & Son of Galashiels when they were building the mill houses in Walkerburn for "Captain" Horsburgh.

1841, 1851 and 1861 Census data refer to a shepherd named James Tait and his family living at Kirna (or Kirnie).

The cottage has also been variously tagged as Kirna or Kirnie Toll House, however this seems unlikely given the nearby turnpike toll house (est. 1830) in Innerleithen.

Kirnie Cottage was notoriously put up for sale in 2011 by a squatter who tried to sell the cottage for £70,000 without the knowledge of the owner.

Kirna Lodge

Kirna Lodge is located within the original boundary walls of The Kirna. It started life as the stable and coach house for The Kirna some time between 1888 and 1903. Today, Kirna Lodge is a three-bedroom house overlooking the Tweed Valley, with a conservatory and a four-car garage. The kitchen is now in what used to be the stable in 1923. The original coach house has made way for a principal bedroom and, more recently, a general purpose room.

The lodge exhibits a flush bracket (OSBM G293) that was used during the Second Geodetic Levelling of Scotland that took place between 1936 and 1952, and was levelled with a height of 157.0421 metersabove mean sea level. This bracket was included on the Innerleithen to Duns Common levelling line.

Ancient structures

Kirnie Tower
Approximately 80 meters to the south of The Kirna, across the A72, is the site of Kirnie Tower. Its site was pointed out in 1856 by residents of Walkerburn who were present at its removal in circa 1840 when its stones were removed for building purposes elsewhere on the Horsburgh estate. Long after its dismantlement it was used as a shepherd's hut. Maps published as far back as 1654 refer to "Kirn" or "Kirna" in approximately the location of Kirnie Tower. Ordnance Survey Name Books in the mid-1800s record the structure as "one of the ancient feudal residences erected for the protection of the  Borders. It was square in appearance".

A series of these peel towers was built in the 15th century along the Tweed valley from its source to Berwick, as early-warning beacons announcing invasion from the Marches.

Romano-british settlement
A scooped homestead, measuring 26x23 meters internally, is situated on the steep SW face of Purvis Hill, approximately 200 meters north of The Kirna. The enclosing wall has been largely lost, but the position of the entrance is still visible. Within the walls is a platform large enough to support two timber houses.

Prehistoric enclosure
Located approximately 270 meters NW of The Kirna is a prehistoric enclosure (settlement). It is recorded as an 'ancient monument forming part of the lands of Caberston' under the Ancient Monuments Act, 1931. The settlement has been mostly destroyed by cultivation, stone-robbing, and the construction of a semi-circular sheepfold, now in ruins. However, sufficient remains to show that it measured about 50 meters N-S by slightly less transversely, and that it was originally enclosed by a wall.

Ancient terraces and tower

The remains of ancient terraces and Purvishill Tower are located approximately 200 meters due west of The Kirna at the base of Purvis Hill. Although they are technically of unknown origin, it is believed that the terraces belong to the Pictish period (600-700AD). Given their unusual scale, character and location, the terraces may have been intended to provide level ground for gardens or orchards, although a more utilitarian agricultural function is also possible. An archaeological evaluation in 2020 suggested that the features originally interpreted as possible cultivation terraces were a series of tracks and paths relating to quarry activity which took place to the N and W of the development area during the 19th and 20th centuries.

Gallery

Notes

References

External links

 Scotland Places: Walkerburn, The Kirna
 British Listed Buildings: Walkerburn, The Kirna
 Registers of Scotland: General Register of Sasines
 Heritage Hub: Records of Henry Ballantyne & Sons, Tweedvale and Tweedholm Mills, Walkerburn
Robert Noble: Timeline

Further reading
Cruft, Kitty, Dunbar, John and Fawcett, Richard. “Borders (The Buildings of Scotland)" (New Haven and London: Yale University Press, 2006) (pp 742)
Strang, Charles Alexander. “Borders and Berwick: Illustrated Architectural Guide to the Scottish Borders and Tweed Valley” (Rutland Press, 1994) (pp 222–223)
Robert Ian Turner. "Frederick Thomas Pilkington (1832 - 1898), His Influences and His Legacy" (1992, Edinburgh University)
T M Jeffery, "The Life and Works of Frederick Thomas Pilkington, Vol 1" (1981, Newcastle School of Architecture)
F W Pearce. "Walkerburn, Its Origins and Progress 1854-1987" (undated, Pillians & Wilson Greenway) (pp 26, 73)
Alex F Young. "Old Innerleithen, Walkerburn and Traquair" (undated, Stenlake Publishing)
Gulvin. "The tweedmakers; a history of the Scottish fancy woollen industry 1600-1914" (1973, Newton Abbot: David & Charles, New York)

Scottish baronial architecture
Villas in the United Kingdom
Country houses in the Scottish Borders
Category A listed buildings in the Scottish Borders
Listed houses in Scotland
Houses completed in 1867
1867 establishments in Scotland